Charette is a municipality of about 1000 people located in Maskinongé Regional County Municipality, in Quebec, Canada.

History
Charette is named in honour of one of its first settlers, Édouard Charette, originally from Sainte-Ursule, who built a saw mill and flour mill around 1875. In 1910, the post office opened and in 1918, the Municipality of Charette was established when the Parish of Notre-Dame-des-Neiges (formed in 1914) was incorporated. Its railway station identified the place with the English name of Charette's Mills for a period of time.

On December 31, 2001, Charette was added to the Maskinongé RCM when Le Centre-de-la-Mauricie Regional County Municipality was dissolved.

Demographics
Population trend:
 Population in 2021: 1,034 (2016 to 2021 population change: 7.5%)
 Population in 2016: 953 
 Population in 2011: 993 
 Population in 2006: 924
 Population in 2001: 941
 Population in 1996: 962
 Population in 1991: 968

Private dwellings occupied by usual residents: 485 (total dwellings: 519)

Mother tongue:
 English as first language: 0%
 French as first language: 99%
 English and French as first language: 0%
 Other as first language: 1%

List of mayors

The mayor is the municipality's highest elected official. Charette has had fourteen mayors. Officially, municipal elections in Charette are on a non-partisan basis.

References

External links
 

Incorporated places in Mauricie
Municipalities in Quebec